Papyrus 57 (in the Gregory-Aland numbering), designated by siglum 𝔓57, is an early copy of the New Testament in Greek. It is a papyrus manuscript of the Acts of the Apostles, it contains only Acts 4:36-5:2.8-10.

The manuscript palaeographically has been assigned to the 4th century (or 5th century).

The Greek text of this codex is a representative of the Alexandrian text-type. Aland placed it in Category II.

It was published by Peter Sanz.

It is currently housed at the Papyrus Collection of the Austrian National Library (Pap. Vindob. G. 26020) in Vienna.

See also 

 Acts 4; Acts 5
 List of New Testament papyri

References

Further reading 

 Peter Sanz, Mitteilungen aus der Papyrussammlung der österreichischen Nationalbibliothek in Wien, N.S., IV (Baden: 1946), pp. 66–67.

New Testament papyri
4th-century biblical manuscripts
Biblical manuscripts of the Austrian National Library
Acts of the Apostles papyri